The NWA World Junior Heavyweight Championship was a professional wrestling world championship and secondary title in the National Boxing/Wrestling Association that was for the lighter wrestlers. It started in 1936 and was unified with the National Wrestling Alliance's NWA World Junior Heavyweight Championship in 1952.

Title history
Key

Reigns

Footnotes

References

General

Specific

National Wrestling Alliance championships
Junior heavyweight wrestling championships
World professional wrestling championships